The 2020 Vuelta a Burgos was a men's road bicycle race which took place from 28 July to 1 August 2020 in the Spanish province of Burgos. It was the 42nd edition of the Vuelta a Burgos stage race, which was established in 1946. The race was rated as a 2.Pro event and formed part of the 2020 UCI Europe Tour and the 2020 UCI ProSeries. The race was made up of five stages.

Teams
Twenty-three teams participated in the race, including 14 of the 19 UCI WorldTeams, six UCI Professional Continental teams, and three UCI Continental teams.

UCI WorldTeams

 
 
 
 
 
 
 
 
 
 
 
 
 
 

UCI Professional Continental Teams

 
 
 
 
 
 

UCI Continental Teams

Route

Stages

Stage 1
28 July 2020 – Burgos to Mirador del Castillo,

Stage 2
29 July 2020 – Castrojeriz to Villadiego,

Stage 3
30 July 2020 – Sargentes de La Lora to Picón Blanco (Espinosa de los Monteros),

Stage 4
31 July 2020 – Gumiel de Izán to Roa de Duero,

Stage 5

Classification leadership

 On stage 2, Alex Aranburu, who was fourth in the points classification, wore the green jersey, because first placed Felix Großschartner wore the violet jersey as leader of the general classification, second placed João Almeida wore the white jersey as leader of the young rider classification, and third placed Alejandro Valverde wore the Spanish national champion's jersey as the defending Spanish national road race champion.
 On stage 3, Fernando Gaviria, who was second in the points classification, wore the green jersey, because first placed Felix Großschartner wore the violet jersey as leader of the general classification.
 On stage 4, Óscar Rodríguez, who was third in the young rider classification, wore the white jersey, because first placed Remco Evenepoel wore the violet jersey as leader of the general classification, and second placed João Almeida wore the green jersey as leader of the points classification.
 On stage 5, João Almeida, who was second in the young rider classification, wore the white jersey, because first placed Remco Evenepoel wore the violet jersey as leader of the general classification.

Classification standings

General classification

Points classification

Mountains classification

Young rider classification

Teams classification

References

External links

2020
2020 UCI Europe Tour
2020 UCI ProSeries
2020 in Spanish road cycling
July 2020 sports events in Spain
August 2020 sports events in Spain